Shelby Davis may refer to:

 Shelby Cullom Davis (1909–1994), American investor and diplomat
 Shelby M.C. Davis (born 1937), American investor; son of Shelby Collum Davis